Firework Ait is an islet in the River Thames in England on the reach above Romney Lock known as the Windsor and Eton reach, Berkshire.  It is the smallest island on the Thames with an official map-published name.

Status
The island is the smallest on the Thames with an official map-published name and is in the middle of a widely separated series of three close to the Windsor (right) bank. It is approximately 100 metres above Windsor Bridge. The facing riverside road in restrictive sections as to motorized traffic provides a promenade and cycle way between the heart of the town centre, a leisure centre and adjoining Alexandra Gardens, a park.

History
An account from the 1840s of life at Eton hypothesises that Percy Bysshe Shelley when at Eton in 1805 would have taken his skiff across to the "eyot which then served for fireworks".

See also
Islands in the River Thames
River island

References

Islands of Berkshire
Islands of the River Thames
Windsor, Berkshire